Nathaniel "Nate" Rogers Dickinson (January 14, 1932 – June 15, 2011) was an American wildlife biologist, and author of Common Sense Wildlife Management: Discourses on Personal Experiences, was published in 1993 by Settle Hill Publishing.

Early life
Dickinson was born in New York City to painter, Sidney Dickinson and Mary Watson Dickinson and raised and educated in Pleasantville, N.Y.  He graduated from Amherst College in 1953 and received a master's degree in wildlife management from Cornell University in 1955.  After two years in the army as a signal corps cryptographer, he served as a wildlife biologist in Maine and in 1961 left to become a big game project leader for the New York State Department of Environmental Conservation.

References

External links
Property Rights Foundation of America

American environmentalists
American non-fiction environmental writers
Amherst College alumni
Cornell University College of Agriculture and Life Sciences alumni
Writers from New York City
1932 births
2011 deaths
Scientists from New York (state)
20th-century American biologists
20th-century American non-fiction writers
20th-century American male writers
American male non-fiction writers